Xela may refer to:

 Exela Technologies, American corporation (NASDAQ stock symbol XELA)
 Quetzaltenango, a Guatemalan city which is more commonly referred to as Xela.
 Xela, the signature that American artist Alex Schomburg used for his airbrushed covers for comic books.
 Xela (musician), an electronic-music artist.
 XELA-AM (1941–2002), a Mexican classical music radio station.
 Xela (beetle) a genus of longhorn beetles in the tribe Xystrocerini.